The 1997 Tashkent Open was a men's tennis tournament held in Tashkent, Uzbekistan and played on outdoor hard courts. It was the inaugural edition of the tournament, part of the  World Series of the 1997 ATP Tour, and was held from 8 September until 15 to September 1997. Second-seeded Tim Henman won the singles final.

Finals

Singles

 Tim Henman defeated  Marc Rosset, 7–6(7–2), 6–4
 It was Henman's 2nd singles title of the year and of his career

Doubles

 Vincenzo Santopadre /  Vincent Spadea defeated  Hicham Arazi /  Eyal Ran, 6–4, 6–7, 6–0

References

 
Tashkent
President's Cup
President's Cup